The Liquor and Cannabis Regulation Branch (formerly the Liquor Control and Licensing Branch) is the agency of the government of British Columbia, within the Ministry of the Public Safety and Solicitor General, responsible for issuing liquor licenses in the province and for enforcing the provisions of the Liquor Control and Licensing Act.

British Columbia's government also has a separate Liquor Distribution Branch, which is responsible for operating the province's monopoly on the sale of alcoholic beverages.

The BC Liquor Distribution Branch is one of the world's largest importers, distributors and retailers of wines, beer and spirits. All wine, spirits, and beer are distributed to a network of government-run and privately owned liquor stores as well as restaurants, bars and pubs.

References

External links

Canadian provincial alcohol departments and agencies
British Columbia government departments and agencies
Canadian provincial cannabis departments and agencies
Cannabis in British Columbia

Alcohol in British Columbia